Paucituberculata  is an order of South American marsupials. Although currently represented only by the seven living species of shrew opossums, this order was formerly much more diverse, with more than 60 extinct species named from the fossil record, particularly from the late Oligocene to early Miocene epochs. The earliest paucituberculatans date to the late Paleocene (Itaboraian South American land mammal age). The group went through a pronounced decline in the middle Miocene epoch, which resulted in the extinction of all families of this order except for the living shrew opossums (Caenolestidae). Extinct families of Paucituberculatans include Pichipilidae, Palaeothentidae, and Abderitidae.

Classification 
It is one of two clades of Ameridelphia, a paraphyletic group; genetic studies have shown these animals to be a sister group to Australidelphia (i.e., Didelphimorphia branched off first).

The Paucituberculata were once considered to be closely related to South American polydolopimorph metatherians, however phylogenetic analyses have found this is not true.

Subdivision 
The order is subdivided into:

 †Bardalestes 
 †Evolestes 
 †Fieratherium 
 †Riolestes 
 Superfamily Caenolestoidea 
 Family Caenolestidae 
 Caenolestes 
 Lestoros 
 †Pseudhalmarhiphus 
 Rhyncholestes 
 †Stilotherium 
 Superfamily †Palaeothentoidea 
 †Perulestes 
 †Pilchenia 
 †Sasawatsu 
 Family †Pichipilidae 
 †Pichipilus 
 †Phonocdromus 
 †Pliolestes 
 †Quirogalestes 
 Family †Palaeothentidae 
 †Antawallathentes 
 †Carlothentes 
 †Chimeralestes 
 †Hondathentes 
 Subfamily †Palaeothentinae 
 †Palaeothentes 
 †Palaepanorthus 
 †Propalaeothentes 
 Subfamily †Decastinae 
 †Acdestis 
 †Acdestoides 
 †Acdestodon 
 †Titanothentes 
 †Trelewthentes 
 Family †Abderitidae 
 †Abderites 
 †Pitheculites 
 †Parabderites

References

Bibliography 
 

Marsupials
Mammal orders
Marsupials of South America
Neogene mammals of South America
Quaternary mammals of South America
Extant Oligocene first appearances
Taxa named by Édouard Louis Trouessart